The Oinoi–Chalcis railway is an  railway line that connects Oinoi (West Attica) with Chalcis, capital of Euboea in Greece. It is one of the most important railway lines in Central Greece. Its southern terminus is Oinoi, where there are connections to Athens and Thessaloniki.

Route
The southern terminus of the Oinoi-Chalkida line is Oinoi railway station in Oinoi, Boeotia. It passes through Kalochori-Panteichi, continuing via Avlida, proceeding north before turning right and ending in Chalcis, in Chalcis, west of the Euripus Strait. The journey time between Athens and Chalcis is around 1 hour and 19 minutes.

Stations
The stations on the line are
 Oinoi railway station (connecting to Athens, Thessaloniki)
 Dilesi railway station
 Agios Georgios railway station
 Kalochori-Panteichi railway station
 Avlida railway station
 Chalcis railway station

History
The Oinoi–Chalcis railway line was opened on 8 March 1904. Construction of the line had been authorized in 1889 by the law AΨΜΕ / 7-4-1889 concerning the construction and operation of the Piraeus-Larissa and Border railway line, but it was started only in 1902 after the foundation of Hellenic State Railways. The inauguration of the line took place on 6 March 1904, along with the construction of the first  of the line, when an official dinner for 400 people was given on the premises of Chalcis railway station, with the presence of three warships, one British, one French and one Greek. The line opened to the traffic two days later on 8 March 1904.

Services

References

External links
OSE

Railway lines in Greece
Standard gauge railways in Greece
Railway lines opened in 1904